Namuwiki is a Paraguay-based Korean language wiki launched on April 17, 2015, powered by the proprietary wiki software The Seed. Its name, "Namu" (나무) translates literally to "tree" in Korean. According to its slogan ("The tree of knowledge that you grow together") and self-description, Namuwiki's stated aim is to share community-driven knowledge and information, whilst respecting the freedom and equal rights of every user.

Namuwiki is not considered an online encyclopedia, and material found on Namuwiki largely retains the personal/subjective style of writing characteristic of the Rigveda Wiki, a Korean-based wiki from which Namuwiki forked. It has been criticized for lack of accuracy and neutrality, with much more lax guidelines than Wikipedia.

History
In April 2015, one of the largest Otaku subculture wikis in Korea, Rigveda Wiki, suffered a massive community dispute when the site owner, Cheongdong, was discovered to have secretly changed the user agreement to privatize the wiki for his personal profit. Users vandalized articles in protest, forcing the closure of the servers. In response, Namuwiki was created as a fork by a user named Namu on April 17. The article count of Namuwiki surpassed that of Rigveda Wiki by April 25, and surpassed Rigveda Wiki's original article count before its vandalism on May 12. Namuwiki emerged as one of the biggest wikis forked from the Rigveda Wiki, and soon became its de facto replacement.

In May 2016, Namu transferred Namuwiki's server management rights to a new owner, UmanLe S.R.L., a company based in Asunción, Paraguay.

In August 2016, one Namuwiki user created an article about "equalism". The article falsely claimed that a new ideology, "equalism", has appeared in the West, and made multiple remarks against feminist ideologies. As South Korea was seeing heated online debates about radical feminist website Megalia during this time, the article quickly gained a lot of attraction and contributions. Although most of the assertions and reference included in the article were false or fabricated, contents of it were widely spread over Korean society, resulting in false articles about the concept of equalism. The false article existed for longer than 6 months, until a Feminist wiki named Femiwiki brought forward specific and definite arguments on January 24, 2017. Soon, it was proved that most of the claims were false, and the original idea of equalism was mostly a fabrication. Later, the disputed article was rewritten at length and was renamed to "Namuwiki Gender Equalism Fabrication Case".

In September 2018, the site began displaying advertisements on the top banner of its pages, ostensibly to help fund its server rental fees.

Content

Articles 
Like its predecessor Rigveda Wiki, Namuwiki's articles are lightly worded and humorous, often containing jokes or references to subculture knowledge from various areas, including movies, games, and online memes. It has a unique form of narrative through the use of strikethroughs, which are primarily applied to sentences that are written as part of a tongue-in-cheek joke. Bolding is used liberally, often to highlight an important phrase. Although the primary focus of articles is placed on popular subcultures (the original targeted material of Rigveda Wiki) like video games, anime, and movies, there are also many articles written on the fields of science, history, scholarship, and current events. However, less emphasis is placed on creating verifiable information; Namuwiki acknowledges on its behalf that its comparatively lax editing policies can cause material to be written incorrectly, biased, or defamatory, especially given a smaller number of contributors. As a result, the articles on Namuwiki are considered to be less scholarly than the likes of the Korean Wikipedia. The tone of Namuwiki is also much lighter, as it allows jokes and puns.

Content of Namuwiki is licensed under the Creative Commons Attribution-NonCommercial-ShareAlike 2.0 Korea (CC BY-NC-SA 2.0 license).

As of December 2022, Namuwiki contained approximately 4,760,171 main articles (including redirects) and over 3,067,897 files.

Projects 
Namuwiki contains over 100 projects in various areas. Areas that it covers include video games, transportation, military, sports, history, education, etc. As of January 2019, there were a total of 72 projects in Namuwiki.

Press coverage 
In March 2017, an article published by the Korean news outlet MK News detailed Namuwiki and the "humorous" writing style of its articles. The article attributed Namuwiki's growth to its accessibility and humor. However, this and its ease of editing also leads to articles with biased and unfounded opinions.

In November 2018, Namuwiki was mentioned by Korean news outlet representative Junghwan Lee as a positive example for news outlets to follow in the context of fake news, explaining that information contributed online from repeated discussion, deletion, and adjustments ultimately creates truthful information.

On January 9, 2019, Korean politician Haejoo Cho formally announced that he had deleted material written on his Namuwiki page, as it contained "false elements," which resulted in political backlash.

Administration 
Umanle S.R.L.'s base of operation in Asunción, Paraguay has led to concerns over the legal venues available for Korean citizens to seek correction of information they consider harmful, given the bureaucratic difficulties in handling legal matters with a foreign entity under foreign law. Various hypotheses have arisen to speculate the motivation behind the wiki's transfer, the most prominent of which characterizes the move as an attempt to avoid sensitive South Korean internet laws.

No information has been revealed about Umanle S.R.L., its employees, or its owner(s). Data from Paraguay's Ministry of Finance confirms its existence, but little else exists to serve as any decisive evidence against the rising suspicions of a dummy corporation.

Although Namuwiki's license is non-commercial, Umanle S.R.L. is classified as a for-profit corporation; September 2018 saw the deployment of advertisements on the top banner of each article, justified by the need to cover server costs. However, as Umanle S.R.L. has declined requests to reveal advertisement profit statistics, there are rising questions to this claim, to the non-commercial license of Namuwiki and any prospective violations thereof.

Accuracy and neutrality 
Namuwiki does not necessarily require sources, nor does it have strict restrictions on contributions containing inaccurate information or subjective perspectives; it is only "recommended" to leave citations in cases of direct quotes. Due to no requirements for fact-checking, Namuwiki has been criticized for lack of accuracy and reliability. The phrase “나무위키 꺼라 (lit. ‘turn off Namuwiki‘)” has become a running joke in many Korean Internet communities, targeting its users who act knowledgeable about certain topics without doing in-depth and credible research outside of Namuwiki.

See also
 List of wikis
 Korean Wikipedia
 Rigveda Wiki
 Subculture
 Lurkmore
 Encyclopedia Dramatica

References

External links
 

 
2015 establishments in South Korea
Internet properties established in 2015
Korean-language websites
Paraguayan websites